Evan Abraham (1901-November 27, 1990) was a footballer who played in the English Football League for Merthyr Town and Walsall. He was born in Swansea, Wales.

References

Welsh footballers
Merthyr Town F.C. players
Walsall F.C. players
English Football League players
1901 births
Year of death missing
Association football outside forwards